Roger William Alder, FRS is an Emeritus Professor of organic chemistry at the University of Bristol.

His research involves the study of novel compounds with unusual properties, such as proton sponges

and stable carbenes.

Alder received the Royal Society of Chemistry Bader Award for organic chemistry in 1993. He has been a fellow of the Royal Society since 2007.

References

British chemists
Fellows of the Royal Society
Academics of the University of Bristol
Year of birth missing (living people)
Living people